Anrijs Matīss (born 13 September 1973) is a Latvian politician and former Minister for Transport of Latvia.

References

1973 births
Living people
Politicians from Riga
New Unity politicians
Transport ministers of Latvia
Deputies of the 12th Saeima
Riga State Gymnasium No.1 alumni
Riga Technical University alumni
Recipients of the Order of the Cross of Terra Mariana, 2nd Class